Pelomonas saccharophila is a Gram-negative soil bacterium. It was originally named Pseudomonas saccharophila in 1940, but was reclassified in 2005 to the newly created genus, Pelomonas. The original strain was isolated from mud.

References

External links
Type strain of Pelomonas saccharophila at BacDive -  the Bacterial Diversity Metadatabase

Comamonadaceae